Vasicinone is a quinazoline alkaloid.  It shows bronchodilator action in vitro but bronchoconstrictor action in vivo. Vasicinone was shown to have an antianaphylactic action. It has been found within Peganum harmala.

Vasicinone has also been studied in combination with the related alkaloid vasicine.  Both the alkaloids in combination (1:1) showed pronounced bronchodilatory activity in vivo and in vitro. Both alkaloids are also respiratory stimulants. Vasicine has a cardiac–depressant effect, while vasicinone is a weak cardiac stimulant; the effect can be normalized by combining the alkaloids. Vasicine is reported to have a uterine stimulant effect.

References

Quinazolines
Alkaloids